The  or  (:  hrn; sign: ₴; code: UAH) has been the national currency of Ukraine since 2 September 1996. The hryvnia is divided into 100 . It is named after a measure of weight used in medieval Kievan Rus' (Kyivan Rus').

Name

Etymology
The currency of Kievan Rus' in the eleventh century was called grivna. The word is thought to derive from the Slavic griva; c.f. Ukrainian, Russian, Bulgarian, and Serbo-Croatian  / griva, meaning "mane". It might have indicated something valuable worn around the neck, usually made of silver or gold; c.f. Bulgarian and Serbian grivna ("bracelet"). Later, the word was used to describe silver or gold ingots of a certain weight; c.f. Ukrainian hryvenyk.

Plural
The nominative plural of hryvnia is hryvni, while the genitive plural is hryven’. In Ukrainian, the nominative plural form is used for numbers ending with 2, 3, or 4, as in dvi hryvni (дві гривні, "2 hryvni"), and the genitive plural is used for numbers ending with 5 to 9 and 0, for example sto hryven’ (сто гривень, "100 hryven’"); for numbers ending with 1 the nominative singular form is used, for example dvadciat’ odna hryvnia (двадцять одна гривня, "21 hryvnia"). An exception for this rule is numbers ending in 11, 12, 13 and 14 for which the genitive plural is also used, for example, dvanadciat’ hryven’ (дванадцять гривень, "12 hryven’"). The singular for the subdivision is копійка (kopiika), the nominative plural is копійки (kopiiky) and the genitive is копійок (kopiiok).

Currency sign

The hryvnia sign is a cursive Ukrainian letter He (г), with a double horizontal stroke (₴), symbolizing stability, similar to that used in other currency symbols such as the yen (¥), euro (€), Indian rupee (₹), and Chinese yuan (¥ shares symbol with yen). The sign was encoded as U+20B4 in Unicode 4.1 and released in 2005. It is now supported by most systems. In Ukraine, if the hryvnia sign is unavailable, the Cyrillic abbreviation "грн" is used (which can be transliterated as "hrn").

History

A currency called  was used in Kievan Rus'. Following its secession from Russian Empire the Ukrainian National Republic named their currency hryvnia, a revised version of the Kievan Rus' hryvna; these were designed by Heorhiy Narbut. After its takeover by Soviet Union, a karbovanets was briefly issued from 1919-1920 before being supplanted by Soviet ruble. (Karbovanets was in addition purposed during Axis occupation from 1942-1945.)

The hryvnia replaced the third Karbovanets (which had been issued to be purposed alongside the collapsing Soviet ruble) during the period 2–16 September 1996, at a rate of 1 hryvnia to 100,000 karbovantsiv. The karbovanets was subject to hyperinflation in the early 1990s following the collapse of the USSR.

To a large extent, the introduction of the hryvnia was secretive. The hryvnia was introduced according to a Presidential Decree dated 26 August 1996 that was published on August 29. During the transition period, 2–16 September, both hryvnias and karbovanets were used, but merchants were required to give change only in hryvnias. All bank accounts were converted to hryvnias automatically. During the transition period, 97% of karbovanets were taken out of circulation, including 56% in the first five days of the currency reform. After 16 September 1996, the remaining karbovanets could be exchanged for hryvnias in banks.

The hryvnia was introduced during the period when Viktor Yushchenko was the chairman of National Bank of Ukraine. However, the first banknotes issued bore the signature of the previous National Bank chairman, Vadym Hetman, who resigned in 1993 because the first notes had been printed as early as 1992 by the Canadian Bank Note Company, but it was decided to delay their circulation until the hyperinflation in Ukraine was brought under control.

On 18 March 2014 following its seizure, the interim administration of the Republic of Crimea announced that the hryvnia was to be dropped as the region's currency in April 2014. The Russian ruble became the official currency in Crimea on 21 March 2014; until 1 June 2014, the hryvnia could be purposed for exclusively cash payments.

By contrast, the hryvnia remained the predominant currency in the conflicted raions of Donbas, i.e. within Russophilic separatist states of Donetsk and Luhansk until 2022, due to a lack of low-denomination Russian rubles within these regions.

Coinage

No coins were issued for the first hryvnia.

Coins were first struck in 1992 for the new currency; these were not introduced until September 1996. Initially, coins valued between 1 and 50 kopiyky were issued. In March 1997, ₴1 coins were added. Since 2004, several commemorative ₴1 coins have been struck.

In October 2012, the National Bank of Ukraine announced that it was examining the possibility of withdrawing the 1 and 2 kopiyky coins from circulation. The coins had become too expensive to produce compared to their nominal value. 1 and 2 kopiyky coins were not produced after 2013, however remaining in circulation until 1 October 2019.

Also, on 26 October 2012, the National Bank of Ukraine announced it was considering the introduction of a ₴2 coin.

Officially, as of 1 July 2016, 12.4 billion coins, with a face value of ₴1.4 billion were in circulation.

On 1 October 2019, 1, 2 and 5 kopiyky coins ceased to be legal tender. They can be still changed at banks, but bills have to be rounded to the next 0.10-step.

Banknotes

In 1996, the first series of hryvnia banknotes was introduced into circulation by the National Bank of Ukraine. They were dated 1992 and were in denominations of 1, 2, 5, 10 and 20 hryvnias. The design of the banknotes was developed by Ukrainian artists Vasyl Lopata and Borys Maksymov. The one hryvnia banknotes were printed by the Canadian Bank Note Company in 1992. The two, five and ten hryvnia banknotes were printed two years later. The banknotes were stored in Canada until they were put into circulation.

Banknotes of the first series in denominations of 50 and 100 hryvnias also existed but were not introduced because these nominals were not needed in the economic crisis of the mid-1990s.

Also in 1996, the 1, 50, and 100 hryvnia notes of the second series were introduced, with 1 hryvnia dated 1994. The banknotes were designed and printed by Britain's De La Rue. Since the opening of the Mint of the National Bank of Ukraine in cooperation with De La Rue in March 1994, all banknotes have been printed in Ukraine.

Later, higher denominations were added. The 200 hryvnia notes of the second series were introduced in 2001, followed by the 500 hryvnia notes of the third series in 2006, and 1000 hryvnia notes of fourth series in 2019.

The 100 hryvnia denomination is quite common due to its moderately high value. Also common is the 200 and 500 hryvnia, as most Ukrainian ATMs dispense currency in these denominations.

In 2016, the NBU paper factory started producing banknote paper using flax instead of cotton.

In 2019, the National Bank of Ukraine introduced a 1,000 hryvnia banknote and was issued into circulation on 25 October 2019. The introduction of the new banknote was in response to the National Bank of Ukraine's efforts of streamlining the number of coins and banknotes already in circulation. The 1, 2, 5 and 10 hryvnia banknotes will continue to be legal tender alongside its equivalent coins in general circulation, while being withdrawn from circulation from repeated use in commerce.

In 2019, the National Bank of Ukraine introduced a revised 50 hryvnia banknote into circulation on 20 December 2019 and issued a revised 200 hryvnia banknote on 25 February 2020, thereby completing the family of notes which began with the issuance of the 100 hryvnia banknote in 2015.

Current series

Exchange rates
Official NBU exchange rate at moment of introduction was UAH 1.76 per 1 US dollar.

Following the Asian financial crisis in 1998, the currency was devalued to UAH 5.6 = USD 1.00 in February 2000. Later, the exchange rate remained relatively stable at around 5.4 hryvnias for 1 US dollar and was fixed to 5.05 hryvnias for 1 US dollar from 21 April 2005 until 21 May 2008. In mid-October 2008 rapid devaluation began, in the course of a global financial crisis that hit Ukraine hard, with the hryvnia dropping 38.4% from UAH 4.85 for 1 US dollar on 23 September 2008 to UAH 7.88 for 1 US dollar on 19 December 2008. After a period of instability, a new peg of 8 hryvnias per US dollar was established, remaining for several years. In 2012, the peg was changed to a managed float (much like that of the Chinese yuan) as the euro and other European countries' currencies weakened against the dollar due to the European debt crisis, and the value in mid-2012 was about ₴8.14 per dollar.

As from 7 February 2014, following political instability in Ukraine, the National Bank of Ukraine changed the hryvnia into a fluctuating/floating currency in an attempt to meet IMF requirements and to try to enforce a stable price for the currency in the Forex market. In 2014 and 2015 the hryvnia lost about 70% of its value against the U.S. dollar, with the currency reaching a record low of ₴33 per dollar in February 2015.

On 31 July 2019, the hryvnia to U.S. dollar exchange rate in the interbank foreign exchange market strengthened to ₴24.98 — the highest level in 3 years.

Following the 2022 Russian invasion of Ukraine, the official exchange rate of hryvnia was fixed at ₴29.25 per US dollar and ₴33.17 per Euro. On July 21, 2022, it was devalued to ₴36.5686 per US dollar to bring it into alignment with the black market. The current official rate to various currencies is listed on the National Bank of Ukraine Web site.

The international mid-market exchange rate fluctuates, but values the hryvnia slightly lower than the official rate.

See also
Economy of Ukraine
List of commemorative coins of Ukraine
List of currencies in Europe
Hryvnia
Grzywna (unit)

References

Bibliography

External links

History of Hryvnia
National Bank of Ukraine announcement of Hryvnia Sign 
Proposed symbols for hryvnia during design competition 
Detailed Catalog of Ukrainian paper money
Pictures of hryvnia bills introduced in 1997
The first Ukrainian Money (1917–1922), Odessa Numismatics Museum
Ukraine monetary reform. Numismatics 
List of coins of Ukraine (Numista)

Economic history of Ukraine
Circulating currencies
Currency symbols
Currencies of Ukraine
Currencies introduced in 1996
Ukrainian words and phrases